The Barbados men's national volleyball team represents Barbados in international volleyball competitions. The dominant forces in men's volleyball in North and Central America are Cuba and the United States.

Results

7th - 2001 Men's NORCECA Volleyball Championship
8th - 2006 Central American and Caribbean Games
6th - 2007 Men's NORCECA Volleyball Championship

Squads

2001 Men's NORCECA Volleyball Championship Squad
Head Coach: Ludger Niles

2007 Men's NORCECA Volleyball Championship Squad
Head Coach: Ludger Niles

References

 Barbados Volleyball Association
 NORCECA

Volleyball
National men's volleyball teams
Men's sport in Barbados
Volleyball in Barbados